Ashmunella levettei is a species of air-breathing land snail, a terrestrial pulmonate gastropod mollusk in the family Polygyridae.

References

Polygyridae
Gastropods described in 1882